Daniel Pighín  (born 4 September 1962) is a retired Argentine football midfielder who played for several clubs in Argentina and Mexico, including Club Gimnasia y Esgrima La Plata, Estudiantes de La Plata and Club Atlas.

Career
Born in Margarita, Santa Fe Province, Pighín played 14 seasons of top-flight club football.

References

External links
 Argentine Primera Statistics
 

1962 births
Living people
People from Vera Department
Argentine footballers
Argentine expatriate footballers
Association football midfielders
Argentine Primera División players
Liga MX players
Club de Gimnasia y Esgrima La Plata footballers
Estudiantes de La Plata footballers
Club Atlético Colón footballers
Rosario Central footballers
Atlas F.C. footballers
Expatriate footballers in Mexico
Sportspeople from Santa Fe Province